Fabian Hergesell (born 25 December 1985) is a German football player who currently plays for SV Schlebusch.

References

External links
  
 

1985 births
Living people
German footballers
Fortuna Düsseldorf players
Rot-Weiß Oberhausen players
FC Viktoria Köln players
SC Preußen Münster players
FC Rot-Weiß Erfurt players
2. Bundesliga players
3. Liga players
Association football defenders
Sportspeople from Leverkusen
Footballers from North Rhine-Westphalia